Caputia medley-woodii is a species of flowering plant in the sunflower family, Asteraceae.

References

Senecioneae
Flora of Southern Africa